Bieniasze refers to the following places in Poland:

 Bieniasze, Podlaskie Voivodeship
 Bieniasze, Warmian-Masurian Voivodeship